The Nebula Award for Best Novel is given each year by the Science Fiction and Fantasy Writers of America (SFWA) for science fiction or fantasy novels. A work of fiction is considered a novel by the organization if it is 40,000 words or longer; awards are also given out for pieces of shorter lengths, in the categories of short story, novelette, and novella. To be eligible for Nebula Award consideration, a novel must have been published in English in the United States. Works published in English elsewhere in the world are also eligible, provided they are released on either a website or in an electronic edition. The Award has been given annually since 1966. Novels which were expanded forms of previously published stories are eligible, and novellas published individually can be considered as novels if the author requests it. The award has been described as one of "the most important of the American science fiction awards" and "the science-fiction and fantasy equivalent" of the Emmy Awards.

Nebula Award nominees and winners are chosen by members of SFWA, though the authors nominated do not need to be members. Works are nominated each year by members in a period around December 15 through January 31, and the six works that receive the most nominations then form the final ballot, with additional nominees possible in the case of ties. Soon after, members are given a month to vote on the ballot, and the final results are presented at the Nebula Awards ceremony in May. Authors are not permitted to nominate their own works, and ties in the final vote are broken, if possible, by the number of nominations the works received.

Beginning with the 2009 awards, the rules were changed to the current format, and nominated works must have been published during that calendar year. Prior to then, the eligibility period for nominations was defined as being one year after the publication date of the work, which allowed the possibility for works to be nominated in the calendar year after their publication, and then be awarded in the calendar year after that. Under the previous process, works were added to a preliminary list for the year if they had ten or more nominations, which were then voted on to create a final ballot, to which the SFWA organizing panel was also allowed to add an additional work if they felt it was overlooked.

During the 58 nomination years, 199 authors have had works nominated, and 44 of these have won (including co-authors and ties). Ursula K. Le Guin has received the most Nebula Awards for Best Novel, with four wins out of six nominations. Joe Haldeman has received the next most: three awards out of four nominations, while nine other authors have each won twice. Jack McDevitt has the most nominations at twelve (with one win), while Poul Anderson and Philip K. Dick tie for having the most nominations without winning an award, at five apiece.

Winners and nominees 
In the following table, the years correspond to the date of the ceremony, rather than when the novel was first published. Each year links to the corresponding "year in literature". Entries with a blue background and an asterisk (*) next to the writer's name have won the award; those with a white background are the other nominees on the shortlist.

  *   Winners and joint winners

See also 
 Hugo Award for Best Novel
 List of joint winners of the Hugo and Nebula awards
 Locus Award for Best Novel

References

External links
 Nebula Awards official site

1966 establishments in the United States
American fiction awards
Awards established in 1966
Novel